Tyler Bennett (born June 27, 1992) is an American Paralympic footballer from Akron, Ohio who won a silver medal in 2010 at the 2010 FIBA Americas Championship and gold medal at the 2016 Summer Paralympics. He used to attend University of Akron and as of 2017 he began attending Clemson University where he joined its soccer program.

References

Paralympic 7-a-side soccer players of the United States
1992 births
Living people
7-a-side footballers at the 2012 Summer Paralympics
7-a-side footballers at the 2016 Summer Paralympics
Soccer players from Akron, Ohio
Association football midfielders
Clemson University alumni
University of Akron alumni
Medalists at the 2016 Summer Paralympics
Paralympic medalists in football 7-a-side
Paralympic gold medalists for the United States
Association football players not categorized by nationality